Matt Johnson (born December 1974) is an American actor and comedian best known for his roles on the HBO animated television series, The Life & Times of Tim.

Biography
Johnson grew up in Ukiah, California, and graduated from the University of Oregon. He voices the characters Rodney, Stan, and Amy's Dad on the HBO animated series The Life & Times of Tim.

He began his career as a stand-up comedian and has voiced hundreds of television and radio commercials. He has appeared in a recurring role on the NBC soap Passions and a co-starring role on the Fox late night comedy, Talkshow with Spike Feresten.

Filmography

Film

Television

Video games

References

External links
 
 
 HBO: The Life & Times of Tim
 Meet Rodney

Male actors from California
American stand-up comedians
American male television actors
Living people
University of Oregon alumni
1974 births
Comedians from California
21st-century American comedians